The 2019 All-Ireland Senior Camogie Championship Final, the 88th event of its kind and the culmination of the 2019 All-Ireland Senior Camogie Championship, was played at Croke Park in Dublin on 8 September 2019.

Deferred coverage of the final was broadcast by Sky Sports for the first time. Galway were the winners.

Background
 were aiming for their third camogie All-Ireland; they previously won in 1996 and 2013.

 aimed for their fourteenth title, their first since 2016.

The two teams had only met in the final once before — in 2013, when Galway won.

Paths to the final

Galway

Kilkenny

Match info

References

1
All-Ireland Senior Camogie Championship Finals
All-Ireland Senior Camogie Championship Final
All-Ireland Senior Camogie Championship Final, 2019